Verônica Silva Hipólito (born 2 June 1996) is a para-athlete from Brazil competing mainly in category T37 sprint events. She competed as an able-bodied athlete before a stroke in 2011 left her with permanent damage to the right side of her body. In 2013, she discovered that she was eligible to compete in Paralympic sports and that year represented Brazil at the 2013 IPC Athletics World Championships.

Personal history
Hipólito was born in São Bernardo do Campo, Brazil in 1996. In 2008, she discovered that she had a brain tumour, which was removed. But in March 2011 she had a stroke that affected the movement on the right side of her body. The stroke affected the right side of her body and she lost strength in both her right leg and arm. Her brain tumour returned in 2012 which she treated with medication.

Career history
Hipólito took up athletics at the age of ten after her parents chose the sport in an effort to help her make friends and learn the value of effort. She competed in able-bodied athletics until 2013 when she discovered that due to the damage caused by her stroke, that she was eligible to compete in para-athletic events.

That year she was selected to represent Brazil at the 2013 IPC Athletics World Championships. There she competed in three events, the 100 m and 200 m T38 sprints and the long jump T37/38. In the long jump she finished sixth, but she medalled in both the 100 m (silver) and the 200 m (gold). The following year she participated in the 2014 Para-South American Games in Santiago where she won gold in the 100 m, 200 m and long jump events.

Notes

References

External links 

 
 Verônica Hipólito at Nauru.com.br 
 
 

1996 births
Living people
Paralympic athletes of Brazil
Brazilian female sprinters
Brazilian female long jumpers
Sportswomen with disabilities
Track and field athletes with disabilities
People from São Bernardo do Campo
Federal University of ABC alumni
Paralympic medalists in athletics (track and field)
Paralympic silver medalists for Brazil
Paralympic bronze medalists for Brazil
Athletes (track and field) at the 2016 Summer Paralympics
Medalists at the 2016 Summer Paralympics
Medalists at the 2015 Parapan American Games
Medalists at the 2019 Parapan American Games
Sportspeople from São Paulo (state)
21st-century Brazilian women